Shallow Water is an unincorporated community in Scott County, Kansas, United States.  As of the 2020 census, the population of the community and nearby areas was 89.

History
Its post office was established January 13, 1913, and closed October 31, 1957. Shallow Water is the northern terminus of the Garden City Western Railway.

Demographics

For statistical purposes, the United States Census Bureau has defined this community as a census-designated place (CDP).

Education
Shallow Water is a part of USD 466 Scott County.

Shallow Water schools were closed through school unification. The Shallow Water High School mascot was Shallow Water Tigers. The Shallow Water Tigers won the Kansas State High School Boys class B Cross Country championship in 1960 and 1961.

Notable people
 Heriberto Hermes (1932-2018), Roman Catholic bishop, was born in Shallow Water; he served as bishop of the Roman Catholic Territorial Prelature of Cristalândia, Brazil from 1990 to 2009.

References

Further reading

External links
 Scott County maps: Current, Historic, KDOT

Unincorporated communities in Scott County, Kansas
Unincorporated communities in Kansas